Gastropila is a genus of fungi in the family Agaricaceae. The genus, described in 1973, contains four puffball-like species distributed in the Americas.

See also
List of Agaricaceae genera
List of Agaricales genera

References

Agaricaceae
Agaricales genera
Taxa described in 1973